The Lagotto Romagnolo is an Italian breed of dog. It originates in the marshlands of the Delta del Po in the eastern part of the Romagna sub-region of Italy. The name derives from Romagnol can lagòt, meaning "water dog". Its traditional function was as a gun dog, specifically a water retriever; since the drainage of large areas of wetland habitat in its area of origin, it is now more often used to hunt for truffles.

History 

The Lagotto originated in the lowlands of Comacchio and marshlands of Ravenna in the Delta del Po, in the eastern part of the Romagna sub-region of Italy. The name derives from Romagnol can lagòt, meaning "water dog". Its traditional function was as a gun dog, specifically a water retriever; since the drainage of large areas of wetland habitat in its area of origin, it is now more often used to hunt for truffles. It has been known since the sixteenth century, but did not become widespread until the nineteenth.

It was provisionally accepted by the Fédération Cynologique Internationale in 1995, and received full acceptance in 2005. In 2018 the Ente Nazionale della Cinofilia Italiana recorded  new registrations.

Characteristics 

It is roughly square in outline, the body length more or less equal to the height. The coat is thick, wool-like and tightly curled into ringlets. It may be completely off-white, or off-white with orange or brown patches or roaning, or solid orange or brown either with or without white markings. 

A Lagotto usually lives for about fifteen years. Neurological disorders that have been identified in the breed include cerebellar abiotrophy and idiopathic epilepsy.

Notes

References

Further reading 

 Eija H. Seppälä, Tarja S. Jokinen, Masaki Fukata, Yuko Fukata, Matthew T. Webster, Elinor K. Karlsson, Sami K. Kilpinen, Frank Steffen, Elisabeth Dietschi, Tosso Leeb, Ranja Eklund, Xiaochu Zhao, Jennifer J. Rilstone, Kerstin Lindblad-Toh, Berge A. Minassian, Hannes Lohi (2011). "LGI2 Truncation Causes a Remitting Focal Epilepsy in Dogs". PLOS Genetics 7 (7): e1002194. .

Dog breeds originating in Italy
FCI breeds
Gundogs
Rare dog breeds
Water dogs